Ivan Mikhailovich Grevs (4 May 1860 – 16 May 1941) was a Russian historian and one of the founders of the Russian school of medievalism that emphasised the influence of the Roman Empire on the social structure of medieval Europe. He was an advocate of the education of women. Doctor of Sciences in Historical Sciences. 

He was born into a landholding family who originally came from England during the time of Peter the Great. The surname had been Greaves. He was born on his father's estate near Lutovinov, Biryusinsky district, Voronezh.

In 1873, he moved to Saint Petersburg, where he died in 1941. He is buried at Volkovskoe Lutheran Cemetery.

Selected publications
 Essays on the History of Roman Landholding (1899)
 Essays on Florentine Culture (1903)
 Tacitus (1946)

References

External links 
Grevs Ivan Mikhailovich, photo, biography

Russian medievalists
1860 births
1941 deaths
Place of birth missing
Russian people of English descent
Russian professors
Russian scholars of Roman history